The province of Jambi in Indonesia is divided into regencies which in turn are divided administratively into districts or kecamatan.

The districts of Jambi, with the regency each falls into, are as follows:

Air Hangat Timur, Kerinci
Air Hangat, Kerinci
Bajubang, Batang Hari
Bangko, Merangin
Batang Asai, Sarolangun
Batang Merangin, Kerinci
Bathin II Babeko, Bungo
Batin XXIV, Batang Hari
Betara, Tanjung Jabung Barat
Danau Kerinci, Kerinci
Dendang, Tanjung Jabung Timur
Depati Tujuh, Kerinci
Gunung Kerinci, Kerinci
Gunung Raya, Kerinci
Hamparan Rawang, Kerinci
Jambi Luar Kota, Muaro Jambi
Jambi Selatan, Jambi
Jambi Timur, Jambi
Jangkat, Merangin
Jelutung, Jambi
Jujuhan, Bungo
Kayu Aro, Kerinci
Keliling Danau, Kerinci
Kumpeh Ulu, Muaro Jambi
Kumpeh, Muaro Jambi
Kumun Debai, Kerinci
Limbur Lubuk Mengkuang, Bungo
Limun, Sarolangun
Mandiangin, Sarolangun
Maro Sebo Ilir, Batang Hari
Maro Sebo Ulu, Batang Hari
Maro Sebo, Muaro Jambi
Mendahara, Tanjung Jabung Timur
Merlung, Tanjung Jabung Barat
Mersam, Batang Hari
Mestong, Muaro Jambi
Muara Bulian, Batang Hari
Muara Bungo, Bungo
Muara Sabak, Tanjung Jabung Timur
Muara Siau, Merangin
Muara Tabir, Tebo
Muara Tembesi, Batang Hari
Muko Muko Batin VII, Bungo
Nipah Panjang, Tanjung Jabung Timur
Pamenang, Merangin
Pasar Jambi, Jambi
Pauh, Sarolangun
Pelawan Singkut, Sarolangun
Pelawan, Sarolangun
Pelayangan, Jambi
Pelepat Ilir, Bungo
Pelepat, Bungo
Pemayung, Batang Hari
Pengabuan, Tanjung Jabung Barat
Pesisir Bukit, Kerinci
Rantau Pandan, Bungo
Rantau Rasau, Tanjung Jabung Timur
Rimbo Bujang, Tebo
Rimbo Ilir, Tebo
Rimbo Ulu, Tebo
Sadu, Tanjung Jabung Timur
Sarolangun, Sarolangun
Sekernan, Muaro Jambi
Serai Serumpun, Tebo
Singkut, Sarolangun
Sitinjau Laut, Kerinci
Siulak, Kerinci
Sumay, Tebo
Sungai Bahar, Muaro Jambi
Sungai Manau, Merangin
Sungai Penuh, Kerinci
Tabir Ulu, Merangin
Tabir, Merangin
Tamiai, Kerinci
Tanah Kampung, Kerinci
Tanah Sepenggal, Bungo
Tanah Tumbuh, Bungo
Tebo Ilir, Tebo
Tebo Tengah, Tebo
Tebo Ulu, Tebo
Tengah Ilir, Tebo
Tungkal Ilir, Tanjung Jabung Barat
Tungkal Ulu, Tanjung Jabung Barat
VII Koto Ulu, Tebo
VII Koto, Tebo 

 
Jambi